= Chatpong Chuenrudeemol =

Thai architect

Chatpong Chuenrudeemol is a Thai architect and founder of Bangkok-based design practice CHAT Architects.

== Early life and education ==
Chatpong was born in Bangkok, Thailand. His family moved to the US when he was six. Chatpong received his Bachelor of Arts in Architecture from UC Berkeley in 1994, and a Master of Architecture from Harvard Graduate School of Design, graduating in 2000. Following graduation, he moved back to Thailand.

== Career ==
Chatpong is known for his "Bangkok Bastards" projects, focusing on informal architecture including informal responses to everyday problems, including makeshift seating, street vending, and improvised slum housing.

Chatpong's first Bangkok Bastards project was Samsen Street Hotel, a former love hotel in Bangkok in which CHAT architects swapped the facade in a scaffolding to create an open, inviting space. The hotel was shortlisted for the 2021 Architectural Review New into Old awards.

In 2023, CHAT Architects completed Angsila Oyster Scaffolding Pavilion, a project off the coast of a fishing village in Chonburi province. The pavilion adapts the local oyster harvesting scaffolds used by fisherman, adding pitched roofs and red agricultural tarps.
